Resistance, Politics, and the American Struggle for Independence, 1765–1775 is a book that examines the role of nonviolent struggle in the period before the American Revolution. Edited by Walter H. Conser, Jr., Ronald M. McCarthy, David J. Toscano and Gene Sharp, the book was published in the United States in 1986. It argues that the Stamp Act resistance and other campaigns from 1765 to 1775 were fundamental for shaping the outcome of the struggle for American independence, and were not merely a "prelude" to armed conflict.

Nonviolent resistance was at the heart of these campaigns, but key features of this nonviolence have been largely neglected by historians. To fill this perceived gap, the book provides a sustained narrative of the 1765–1775 resistance, followed by a set of interpretive essays aimed to provoke further discussion and inquiry. Six hypothetical explanations are offered for why the colonists shifted to military struggle, despite the considerable success of nonviolent struggle.
Reviews have appeared in several historical and legal journals.

Origins
Resistance, Politics, and the American Struggle for Independence, 1765–1775 (RPASI), claims that most historians of colonial America have treated the events of 1765–1775 as merely a "prelude" 
to the US Revolutionary War. Events such as the resistance to the Stamp Act and Townshend Acts are typically treated as "not significant in themselves."
This book, however

In their preface, the editors state that their interest in the historical period covered in RPASI began in the 1970s, when they were studying nonviolent action as a pragmatic tool of civilian struggle. In their work, they

Indeed, "researchers often look throughout the length of a period for evidence of what they regard as its inevitable outcome... for example... for the roots of war.... In the process, they... may ignore the contributions of alternative means to the outcome." An example is that "Samuel Adams, whom many... associate with the tactics of violence, issued numerous statements prior to Lexington and Concord opposing the use of armed force" (see quote at left).

The book project was originally conceived due to recognition by co-editor Gene Sharp, a leading scholar of nonviolent struggle, that the American colonists had "employed the techniques of nonviolent resistance"  in their struggle against Great Britain.

The book was sponsored by Harvard University's Center for International Affairs, and by the Albert Einstein Institution, both led by Sharp. 
The editors claim that the book "if read carefully, is likely to spark scholarly controversy and argument," and that they "believe that such debate can clarify the issues... and enhance the understanding of this critical decade in our history."

Topics covered

Resistance, Politics, and the American Struggle for Independence, 1765-1775 contains 14 chapters that are intended to "relate integrally to one another and provide a complete narrative of the period [of 1765-1775]." These chapters are listed in the table at right.

After the first introductory chapter, the next 7 chapters contain the book's "narrative section," which focuses on describing the struggles from 1765 to 1775 chronologically, using the "terminology of the day," and only "rarely [making] use of the term 'nonviolent action.'"
The book's final 6 chapters are analytical, offering interpretations of the decade's events. These chapters address questions raised in the narrative section, and also suggest areas for future research.

Basic concepts are introduced in Chapter 1, which gives an overview of the three main resistance campaigns of 1765 to 1775 opposing the Stamp Act of 1765, the Townsend Acts of 1767, and the Coercive Acts of 1774. Nonviolent action is described as a technique that operates to bring about change through serving to "manipulate the shared social, cultural, economic and political system in which the opposing parties engage in conflict." Citing Sharp's Politics of Nonviolent Action, they divide methods of nonviolent action into the three categories of nonviolent protest and persuasion, noncooperation, and nonviolent intervention. Nonviolent action succeeds by "rendering the opponent's sources of power unusable, unworkable, and uncontrollable," through mechanisms that may include conversion, accommodation, or "nonviolent coercion [that] occurs when an opponent is forced against his or her will to grant the actionists' demands."

The editors argue (Ch. 1) that previous scholarship has overlooked "the degree to which the colonists used a kind of 'weapons system' that operated without force of arms or violence in trying to compel the British government to change its policies." Viewed from this angle, commercial resistance (nonimportation) is analyzed closely (Ch. 9). It is apparent that the colonists' skill in applying the methods of nonviolent struggle "improved greatly over the decade," as did the "intellectual underpinnings" of their resistance (Chs. 10, 11).

Still, at the close of the decade, the nonviolent movement was abandoned in favor of military resistance, and the editors discuss six alternative hypothetical explanations for why this shift occurred (Ch. 12; see table at right). The hypothetical explanations are not meant as mutually exclusive, but as "avenues for fruitful inquiry." Indeed,

John Adams (quoted above right), who lived through and helped lead the independence struggle, claimed that "The revolution was... substantially effected before hostilities commenced." McCarthy (Ch. 14) argues that "independence in many of the colonies had essentially been achieved prior to the commencement of military hostilities at Lexington and Concord."

The book concludes with 7 appendices that reproduce key historical materials (see table below right), as well as a 23-page index.

Reviews and influence
Reviews have appeared in 
the Journal of Southern History
the Journal of American History,
and the Law and History Review.

In the Journal of Southern History, Mills wrote of RPASI that "Although the work covers familiar ground, the approach is fresh and the treatment is stimulating. The interpretative theme is certain to provoke debate."
He added that "The criticisms one might make of this study are cosmetic (e.g., the considerable variations in the sizes of several chapters) rather than substantive."

In the Journal of American History, Ireland commended the historical essays as shedding light on important aspects of the American Revolution, stating that "having them collected together in one place is useful." He was critical of most chapters by the editors as "much less valuable," and came away feeling "that I have missed the point, or that there is no point here of any great moment for a historian."

In Law and History Review, Roeber wrote that RPASI "includes stimulating essays by ten authors, four British," and

But in the American colonial frontier, "military tactics were acknowledged by all to be more vicious than those employed in European conflicts." Thus, for Roeber, "One comes away from this rich and stimulating series of essays with the disturbing sense that Americans had, at the very time of the Republic's founding, been swept up on a tide of violent resistance that fit with their colonial frontier experience."

Mills wrote that "One can hope that the challenge to conduct more research into the period from 1774 to 1775 and the shift from nonviolent to violent action will be heeded."

See also
Nonviolent revolution

References

1986 non-fiction books
Nonviolence
Works by Gene Sharp
History books about the American Revolution